Krasny Kushak (Qıźıl Quşaq) is a rural locality (a khutor) in Ivano-Kuvalatsky Selsoviet, Zilairsky District, Bashkortostan, Russia. The population was 10 as of 2010. There are 2 streets.

Geography 
Krasny Kushak is located 34 km north of Zilair (the district's administrative centre) by road. Berdyash Russky is the nearest rural locality.

References 

Rural localities in Zilairsky District